St Minver and St Endellion was an electoral division of Cornwall in the United Kingdom which returned one member to sit on Cornwall Council between 2013 and 2021. It was abolished at the 2021 local elections, being succeeded by Wadebridge East and St Minver and Wadebridge West and St Mabyn.

Councillors

Extent
St Minver and St Endellion represented the villages of Pendoggett, Port Isaac, Polzeath, Trebetherick, Pityme, St Minver, Rock and Tredrizzick, and the hamlets of Trelights, St Endellion, Port Quin, New Polzeath, Splatt, Penmayne, Stoptide, Porthilly and Trevanger. The division covered 5,332 hectares in total.

Election results

2017 election

2013 election

References

Electoral divisions of Cornwall Council